Eulagisca uschakovi is a giant scale worm known from the Antarctic, in waters such as off Mac.Robertson Land, Palmer Archipelago and the Weddell Sea, at depths of 10 to 920m.

Description 
Specimens can grow to up to around 190mm in length and have 39 segments with 15 pairs of elytra. The body is brownish at the mid-dorsum. The elytra are large and thin, with brownish splashes of pigmentation and fringe of sharp, pointed papillae along their margin. Wide, ovular prostomium with the median antenna with a large ceratophore in an anterior notch and lateral antennae inserted terminally on anterior margin of prostomium. Notochaetae are capillary-type and thicker than the capillary Neurochaetae.

References

Phyllodocida